Conus antoniomonteiroi is a species of sea snail, a marine gastropod mollusk in the family Conidae, the cone snails and their allies.

Like all species within the genus Conus, these snails are predatory and venomous. They are capable of "stinging" humans, therefore live ones should be handled carefully or not at all.

Description
The size of the shell varies between 15 mm and 26 mm.

Distribution
This species occurs in the Atlantic Ocean off the island of Sal, Cape Verde.

References

 Filmer R.M. (2001). A Catalogue of Nomenclature and Taxonomy in the Living Conidae 1758–1998. Backhuys Publishers, Leiden. 388pp.
 Afonso C.M.L. & Tenorio M.J. (2004) Conus cuneolus Reeve, 1843 and related species in Sal Island, Cape Verde Archipelago (Gastropoda, Conidae). Visaya 1(1): 31–43.
 Tucker J.K. (2009). Recent cone species database. September 4, 2009 Edition
 Tucker J.K. & Tenorio M.J. (2009) Systematic classification of Recent and fossil conoidean gastropods. Hackenheim: Conchbooks. 296 
  Puillandre N., Duda T.F., Meyer C., Olivera B.M. & Bouchet P. (2015). One, four or 100 genera? A new classification of the cone snails. Journal of Molluscan Studies. 81: 1–23

External links
 The Conus Biodiversity website
 http://www.coneshells-am.ru/ Cone Shells – Knights of the Sea
 

antoniomonteiroi
Gastropods of Cape Verde
Fauna of Sal, Cape Verde
Gastropods described in 1990